Emilio Pegoraro (19 October 1921 – 18 December 2022) was an Italian partisan and politician. A member of the Communist Party, he served in the Senate of the Republic from 1968 to 1972 and again from 1976 to 1979 and in the Chamber of Deputies from 1972 to 1976.

Pegoraro died in Padua on 18 December 2022, at the age of 101.

References

1921 births
2022 deaths
Italian Communist Party politicians
Deputies of Legislature V of Italy
Deputies of Legislature VI of Italy
Deputies of Legislature VII of Italy
Italian centenarians
Men centenarians
Politicians from the Province of Padua